Kvemo Sarali is a village in Georgia country. The village has a population of 1,370 people and is administratively part of the Shulaveri community (temi, თემი) within the Marneuli Municipality. The Tbilisi - Marneuli - Sadakhlo railway line passes alongside the village, as well as the S7 international highway to Armenia.

Demographics 
Kvemo Sarali had a population of 1,370 according to the 2014 census. Apart from nine residents the village is mono-ethnic Azerbaijani.

Sights 
 The mosque in the village is named after Fatima Zehra.
 High school

Notable natives 
 Alexander Mayorov (1942-2017) – Soviet film director, screenwriter, producer.

References 

Populated places in Marneuli Municipality